The 1835 Concepción earthquake occurred near the neighboring cities of Concepción and Talcahuano in Chile on 20 February at 11:30 local time (15:30 UTC) and has an estimated magnitude of about 8.5 . The earthquake triggered a tsunami which caused the destruction of Talcahuano. A total of at least 50 people died from the effects of the earthquake and the tsunami. The earthquake caused damage from San Fernando in the north to Osorno in the south. It was felt over a still wider area from Copiapó in the north to the island of Chiloe in the south and as far west as the Juan Fernández Islands.

Tectonic setting
Chile lies above the convergent boundary between the Nazca Plate and the South American Plate, with a convergence rate of 66 mm/yr. This boundary has been the site of many historical megathrust earthquakes, including the largest earthquake ever recorded. The rupture area of the 1835 earthquake was noted as a prominent seismic gap, leading to a forecast in 2009 of a large earthquake ( 8.0–8.5) within a few decades. The 2010 Chile earthquake appears to have ruptured this part of the plate interface.

Damage
Concepción was devastated, with most buildings being destroyed. A later survey found that 33% of kiln-dried brick buildings, 71% of mud-brick buildings and 95% of stone-built constructions were destroyed with all the rest being damaged. Despite this degree of damage only 50 people were reported dead. The low level of fatalities was attributed to the gradual increase in the intensity of shaking and that the earthquake occurred during the middle of the day, giving most of the inhabitants time to get clear. The destruction at Talcahuano was greater still due to the effects of the tsunami, which left only the lower parts of some buildings standing. A schooner was swept about 200 m inland, into the middle of the ruined town. There were few deaths, as the inhabitants had time to run up the hills behind the town.

Characteristics

Earthquake
The shaking lasted for two minutes, with gradually increasing intensity. At least 300 aftershocks were noted during the next 12 days.

Tsunami

Remarks
Charles Darwin was visiting the area while on the second voyage of HMS Beagle and recorded his observations of the earthquake in Valdivia and its effects and the subsequent tsunami in Concepción and Talcahuano. He remarked:

Beagles captain, Robert FitzRoy, wrote a paper suggesting that the earthquake had affected the currents running along the South American coast. The paper was submitted to the Admiralty during the court martial of Captain Michael Seymour of HMS Challenger, whose ship was run ashore on rocks in May 1835 near the mouth of the Leübu River. Seymour was exonerated due in part to Fitzroy's argument.

See also
 List of earthquakes in Chile
 List of historical earthquakes
 List of historical tsunamis

References

Megathrust earthquakes in Chile
Concepcion Earthquake, 1835
Concepcion Earthquake, 1835
Tsunamis in Chile
1835 tsunamis
February 1835 events
1835 disasters in Chile